Hate, Malice, Revenge is the debut studio album by American deathcore band All Shall Perish. Originally, the album was distributed by the small Japanese label Amputated Vein in 2003, and was then re-released by Nuclear Blast in 2005.

Track listing
All music and lyrics by All Shall Perish

Personnel
Craig Betit – vocals
Caysen Russo – guitar, vocals
Ben Orum – guitar
Mike Tiner – bass guitar
Matt Kuykendall – drums

'''Production
 All Shall Perish – producer
 Zack Ohren – producer, engineer, mastering, mixing

References

2003 debut albums
All Shall Perish albums